Valea Râmnicului is a commune in Buzău County, Muntenia, Romania. It is composed of three villages: Oreavu, Rubla and Valea Râmnicului.

Notes

Communes in Buzău County
Localities in Muntenia